Dariusz Piontkowski (born 17 December 1964 in Sielc) is a Polish politician, former marshal of Podlasie province, and current MP (in his third term). From 4 June 2019 to 19 October 2020 he was the minister of national education under Mateusz Morawiecki. He is in charge of the Law and Justice organization in the Podlasie province. Piontkowski was educated at Warsaw University (Humanities Faculty in Białystok), the Academy of Finance and Management in Białystok and at the Białystok School of Public Administration.

He has worked as a teacher at the Adam Mickiewicz High School No. 1 in Białystok. He twice received the Cross of Merit (Bronze in 2000 and Silver in 2007), awarded by the President.

References

Government ministers of Poland
Education ministers
Law and Justice politicians
Living people
1964 births
People from Bielsk County
Schoolteachers from Białystok
University of Warsaw alumni